This is a list of notable Italian soups. Soups are sometimes served as the primo, or first course in Italian cuisine. In some regions of Italy, such as Veneto, soup is eaten more than pasta.

Italian soups

 Acquacotta – originally a peasant food, its preparation and consumption dates back to ancient history
 Bagnun –  based mainly on anchovies
 Buridda – a seafood soup or stew from Liguria in Northern Italy
 Garmugia – originated in Lucca, Tuscany, central Italy
 Ginestrata – originated in Tuscany, Northern Italy, and can be described as a thin, lightly spiced egg-based soup
 Macaroni soup – a traditional dish in Italy that is sometimes served with beans, which is known as pasta e fagioli
 Maccu – a Sicilian soup and also a foodstuff that is prepared with dried and crushed fava beans (also known as broad beans) and fennel as primary ingredients. It dates back to ancient history.
 Minestra di ceci – prepared with chickpeas as a main ingredient, it is a common soup in the Abruzzo region of Italy.
 Minestra maritata or Italian wedding soup
 Minestrone – a thick soup of Italian origin made with vegetables, often with the addition of pasta or rice. Common ingredients include beans, onions, celery, carrots, stock, and tomatoes.
 Panada – In northeastern Italy, it serves as an inexpensive meal in the poor areas of the countryside. It may be enriched with eggs, beef broth, and grated cheese. It was frequently prepared as a meal for elderly or ill people.
 Pappa al pomodoro – a thick Tuscan soup typically prepared with fresh tomatoes, bread, olive oil, garlic, basil, and various other fresh ingredients
 Ribollita – a famous Tuscan soup, a hearty potage made with bread and vegetables. There are many variations but the main ingredients always include leftover bread, cannellini beans and inexpensive vegetables such as carrot, cabbage, beans, silverbeet, cavolo nero, and onion. Its name literally means "reboiled".
Sciusceddu – prepared using meatballs and eggs as primary ingredients
 Soup alla Canavese – made from white stock, tomato puree, butter, carrot, celery, onion, cauliflower, bacon fat, Parmesan cheese, parsley, sage, salt and pepper
 Stracciatella – consists of meat broth and small shreds of an egg-based mixture, prepared by drizzling the mixture into boiling broth and stirring
 Soup alla modenese – made with stock, spinach, butter, salt, eggs, Parmesan cheese, nutmeg and croutons
 Walnut soup – prepared in the region of Piedmont, which has a significant amount of walnut groves
 Zuppa toscana – made with Italian sausage, crushed red peppers, diced white onion, bacon, garlic puree, chicken bouillon, heavy cream, and potatoes

See also
 List of Italian dishes
 List of soups
 List of stews

References

External links

 Italian Soups. Food & Wine.
 Italian Soup Recipes. Country Living.

 
Italy
Soups